Woodbridge is a surname. Notable people with the surname include:
Benjamin Woodbridge (1622–1684), English clergyman and controversialist
Benjamin Ruggles Woodbridge (1739–1819), doctor, legislator and colonel of the Massachusetts militia during the American Revolutionary War
Charles Woodbridge (1902–1980), American Presbyterian missionary
Edward Woodbridge (1794–1863), English amateur cricketer
Frederick Woodbridge (disambiguation)
George Woodbridge (actor) (1907–1973), British actor
George Woodbridge (illustrator) (1930–2004), American illustrator
John Woodbridge V (1582–1637), English clergyman
John Woodbridge VI (1613–1696), English nonconformist who emigrated to New England
Jonathan Edwards Woodbridge (1844-1935), American shipbuilder and naval architect
Margaret Woodbridge (1902–1995), American competition swimmer
Mary A. Brayton Woodbridge  (1830 – 1894), American temperance reformer and editor
Nick Woodbridge (born 1986), British modern pentathlete
Samuel Merrill Woodbridge (1819–1905), American clergyman, theologian, author and college professor
Stan Woodbridge (1921–1945), Royal Air Force sergeant, George Cross recipient
Timothy Woodbridge (1709–1774), American missionary, deacon and schoolteacher, later a judge, representative, and Superintendent of Indian Affairs
Todd Woodbridge (born 1971), Australian tennis player
Valerie Woodbridge, Australian Paralympic athlete
William Woodbridge (1780–1861), U.S. statesman
William Channing Woodbridge (1794–1845), American geographer

See also
Baron Woodbridge